Protozoa (singular: protozoan or protozoon; alternative plural: protozoans) are a group of single-celled eukaryotes, either free-living or parasitic, that feed on organic matter such as other microorganisms or organic tissues and debris. Historically, protozoans were regarded as "one-celled animals", because they often possess animal-like behaviours, such as motility and predation, and lack a cell wall, as found in plants and many algae.

When first introduced by Georg Goldfuss (originally spelled Goldfuß) in 1818, the taxon Protozoa was erected as a class within the Animalia, with the word 'protozoa' meaning "first animals". In later classification schemes it was elevated to a variety of higher ranks, including phylum, subkingdom and kingdom, and sometimes included within Protoctista or Protista. The approach of classifying Protozoa within the context of Animalia was widespread in the 19th and early 20th century, but not universal. By the 1970s, it became usual to require that all taxa be monophyletic (derived from a common ancestor that would also be regarded as protozoan), and holophyletic (containing all of the known descendants of that common ancestor). The taxon 'Protozoa' fails to meet these standards, and the practices of grouping protozoa with animals, and treating them as closely related, are no longer justifiable. The term continues to be used in a loose way to describe single-celled protists (that is, eukaryotes that are not animals, plants, or fungi) that feed by heterotrophy. Some examples of protozoa are Amoeba, Paramecium, Euglena and Trypanosoma.

Despite awareness that the traditional taxonomic concept of "Protozoa" did not meet contemporary taxonomic standards, some authors have continued to use the name, while applying it to differing scopes of organisms. In a series of classifications by Thomas Cavalier-Smith and collaborators since 1981, the taxon Protozoa was applied to a restricted circumscription of organisms, and ranked as a kingdom. A scheme presented by Ruggiero et al. in 2015, places eight not closely related phyla within Kingdom Protozoa: Euglenozoa, Amoebozoa, Metamonada, Choanozoa sensu Cavalier-Smith, Loukozoa, Percolozoa, Microsporidia and Sulcozoa. Notably, this approach excludes several major groups of organisms traditionally placed among the protozoa, including the ciliates, dinoflagellates, foraminifera, and the parasitic apicomplexans, which were located in other groups such as Alveolata and Stramenopiles, under the polyphyletic Chromista. The Protozoa in this scheme do not form a monophyletic and holophyletic group (clade), but a paraphyletic group or evolutionary grade, because it excludes some descendants of Protozoa, as used in this sense.

Science 
 

The word "protozoa" (singular protozoon) was coined in 1818 by zoologist Georg August Goldfuss (=Goldfuß), as the Greek equivalent of the German , meaning "primitive, or original animals" ( ‘proto-’ +  ‘animal’). Goldfuss created Protozoa as a class containing what he believed to be the simplest animals. Originally, the group included not only single-celled microorganisms but also some "lower" multicellular animals, such as rotifers, corals, sponges, jellyfish, bryozoa and polychaete worms. The use of Protozoa as a formal taxon has been discouraged by some researchers, mainly because the term implies kinship with animals (Metazoa) and promotes an arbitrary separation of "animal-like" from "plant-like" organisms.

In 1848, as a result of advancements in the design and construction of microscopes and the emergence of a cell theory pioneered by Theodor Schwann and Matthias Schleiden, the anatomist and zoologist C. T. von Siebold proposed that the bodies of protozoa such as ciliates and amoebae consisted of single cells, similar to those from which the multicellular tissues of plants and animals were constructed. Von Siebold redefined Protozoa to include only such unicellular forms, to the exclusion of all metazoa (animals). At the same time, he raised the group to the level of a phylum containing two broad classes of microorganisms: Infusoria (mostly ciliates) and flagellates (flagellated protists) and amoebae (amoeboid organisms). The definition of Protozoa as a phylum or sub-kingdom composed of "unicellular animals" was adopted by the zoologist Otto Bütschli—celebrated at his centenary as the "architect of protozoology".  With its increasing visibility, the term 'protozoa' and the discipline of 'protozoology' came into wide use.

As a phylum under Animalia, the Protozoa were firmly rooted in a simplistic "two-kingdom" concept of life, according to which all living beings were classified as either animals or plants. As long as this scheme remained dominant, the protozoa were understood to be animals and studied in departments of Zoology, while photosynthetic microorganisms and microscopic fungi—the so-called Protophyta—were assigned to the Plants, and studied in departments of Botany.

Criticism of this system began in the latter half of the 19th century, with the realization that many organisms met the criteria for inclusion among both plants and animals. For example, the algae Euglena and Dinobryon have chloroplasts for photosynthesis, like plants, but can also feed on organic matter and are motile, like animals. In 1860, John Hogg argued against the use of "protozoa", on the grounds that "naturalists are divided in opinion — and probably some will ever continue so—whether many of these organisms or living beings, are animals or plants." As an alternative, he proposed a new kingdom called Primigenum, consisting of both the protozoa and unicellular algae, which he combined under the name "Protoctista". In Hoggs's conception, the animal and plant kingdoms were likened to two great "pyramids" blending at their bases in the Kingdom Primigenum.

Six years later, Ernst Haeckel also proposed a third kingdom of life, which he named Protista. At first, Haeckel included a few multicellular organisms in this kingdom, but in later work, he restricted the Protista to single-celled organisms, or simple colonies whose individual cells are not differentiated into different kinds of tissues.

Despite these proposals, Protozoa emerged as the preferred taxonomic placement for heterotrophic microorganisms such as amoebae and ciliates, and remained so for more than a century. In the course of the 20th century, the old "two kingdom" system began to weaken, with the growing awareness that fungi did not belong among the plants, and that most of the unicellular protozoa were no more closely related to the animals than they were to the plants. By mid-century, some biologists, such as Herbert Copeland, Robert H. Whittaker and Lynn Margulis, advocated the revival of Haeckel's Protista or Hogg's Protoctista as a kingdom-level eukaryotic group, alongside Plants, Animals and Fungi. A variety of multi-kingdom systems were proposed, and the Kingdoms Protista and Protoctista became established in biology texts and curricula.

While most taxonomists have abandoned Protozoa as a high-level group, Cavalier-Smith used the term with a different circumscription.  In 2015, Protozoa sensu Cavalier-Smith excluded several major groups of organisms traditionally placed among the protozoa (such as ciliates, dinoflagellates and foraminifera). This and similar concepts of Protozoa are of a paraphyletic group which does not include all organisms that descended from Protozoa. In this case, the most significant absences were of the animals and fungi. The continued use by some of the 'Protozoa' in its old sense highlights the uncertainty as to what is meant by the word 'Protozoa', the need for disambiguating statements (here, the term 'Protozoa' is used in the sense intended by Goldfuß), and the problems that arise when new meanings are given to familiar taxonomic terms.

Some authors classify Protozoa as a subgroup of mostly motile Protists. Others class any unicellular eukaryotic microorganism as a Protist, and make no reference to 'Protozoa'.

In 2005, members of the Society of Protozoologists voted to change its name to the International Society of Protistologists.

Characteristics

Reproduction 
Reproduction in Protozoa can be sexual or asexual. Most Protozoa reproduce asexually through binary fission.

Many parasitic Protozoa reproduce both asexually and sexually. However, sexual reproduction is rare among free-living protozoa and it usually occurs when food is scarce or the environment changes drastically. Both isogamy and anisogamy occur in Protozoa with anisogamy being the more common form of sexual reproduction.

Size 

Protozoa, as traditionally defined, range in size from as little as 1 micrometre to several millimetres, or more. Among the largest are the deep-sea–dwelling xenophyophores, single-celled foraminifera whose shells can reach 20 cm in diameter.

Habitat 

Free-living protozoa are common and often abundant in fresh, brackish and salt water, as well as other moist environments, such as soils and mosses. Some species thrive in extreme environments such as hot springs and hypersaline lakes and lagoons. All protozoa require a moist habitat; however, some can survive for long periods of time in dry environments, by forming resting cysts that enable them to remain dormant until conditions improve.

Parasitic and symbiotic protozoa live on or within other organisms, including vertebrates and invertebrates, as well as plants and other single-celled organisms. Some are harmless or beneficial to their host organisms; others may be significant causes of diseases, such as babesia, malaria and toxoplasmosis.

Association between protozoan symbionts and their host organisms can be mutually beneficial. Flagellated protozoa such as Trichonympha and Pyrsonympha inhabit the guts of termites, where they enable their insect host to digest wood by helping to break down complex sugars into smaller, more easily digested molecules. A wide range of protozoa live commensally in the rumens of ruminant animals, such as cattle and sheep. These include flagellates, such as Trichomonas, and ciliated protozoa, such as Isotricha and Entodinium.  The ciliate subclass Astomatia is composed entirely of mouthless symbionts adapted for life in the guts of annelid worms.

Feeding 

All protozoa are heterotrophic, deriving nutrients from other organisms, either by ingesting them whole by phagocytosis or taking up dissolved organic matter or micro-particles (osmotrophy). Phagocytosis may involve engulfing organic particles with pseudopodia (as amoebae do), taking in food through a specialized mouth-like aperture called a cytostome, or using stiffened ingestion organelles

Parasitic protozoa use a wide variety of feeding strategies, and some may change methods of feeding in different phases of their life cycle. For instance, the malaria parasite Plasmodium feeds by pinocytosis during its immature trophozoite stage of life (ring phase), but develops a dedicated feeding organelle (cytostome) as it matures within a host's red blood cell.

Protozoa may also live as mixotrophs, combining a heterotrophic diet with some form of autotrophy. Some protozoa form close associations with symbiotic photosynthetic algae (zoochlorellae), which live and grow within the membranes of the larger cell and provide nutrients to the host. The algae are not digested, but reproduce and are distributed between division products. The organism may benefit at times by deriving some of its nutrients from the algal endosymbionts or by surviving anoxic conditions because of the oxygen produced by algal photosynthesis. Some protozoans practice kleptoplasty, stealing chloroplasts from prey organisms and maintaining them within their own cell bodies as they continue to produce nutrients through photosynthesis. The ciliate Mesodinium rubrum retains functioning plastids from the cryptophyte algae on which it feeds, using them to nourish themselves by autotrophy. The symbionts may be passed along to dinoflagellates of the genus Dinophysis, which prey on Mesodinium rubrum but keep the enslaved plastids for themselves. Within Dinophysis, these plastids can continue to function for months.

Motility 

Organisms traditionally classified as protozoa are abundant in aqueous environments and soil, occupying a range of trophic levels. The group includes flagellates (which move with the help of undulating and beating flagella). Ciliates (which move by using hair-like structures called cilia) and amoebae (which move by the use of temporary extensions of cytoplasm called pseudopodia). Many protozoa, such as the agents of amoebic meningitis, use both pseudopodia and flagella.  Some protozoa attach to the substrate or form cysts so they do not move around (sessile).  Most sessile protozoa are able to move around at some stage in the life cycle, such as after cell division. The term 'theront' has been used for actively motile phases, as opposed to 'trophont' or 'trophozoite' that refers to feeding stages.

Walls, pellicles, scales, and skeletons 
Unlike plants, fungi and most types of algae, most protozoa do not have a rigid external cell wall, but are usually enveloped by elastic structures of membranes that permit movement of the cell. In some protozoa, such as the ciliates and euglenozoans, the outer membrane of the cell is supported by a cytoskeletal infrastructure, which may be referred to as a "pellicle". The pellicle gives shape to the cell, especially during locomotion. Pellicles of protozoan organisms vary from flexible and elastic to fairly rigid. In ciliates and Apicomplexa, the pellicle includes a layer of closely packed vesicles called alveoli. In euglenids, the pellicle is formed from protein strips arranged spirally along the length of the body. Familiar examples of protists with a pellicle are the euglenoids and the ciliate Paramecium. In some protozoa, the pellicle hosts epibiotic bacteria that adhere to the surface by their fimbriae (attachment pili).

Life cycle 

Some protozoa have two-phase life cycles, alternating between proliferative stages (e.g., trophozoites) and resting cysts. As cysts, some protozoa can survive harsh conditions, such as exposure to extreme temperatures or harmful chemicals, or long periods without access to nutrients, water, or oxygen. Encysting enables parasitic species to survive outside of a host, and allows their transmission from one host to another. When protozoa are in the form of trophozoites (Greek tropho = to nourish), they actively feed. The conversion of a trophozoite to cyst form is known as encystation, while the process of transforming back into a trophozoite is known as excystment.

Protozoa mostly reproduce asexually by binary fission or multiple fission. Many protozoa also exchange genetic material by sexual means (typically, through conjugation), but this is generally decoupled from the process of reproduction, and does not immediately result in increased population. Thus, sexuality can be optional.

Although meiotic sex is widespread among present day eukaryotes, it has, until recently, been unclear whether or not eukaryotes were sexual early in their evolution. Owing to recent advances in gene detection and other techniques, evidence has been found for some form of meiotic sex in an increasing number of protozoa of lineages that diverged early in eukaryotic evolution. (See eukaryote reproduction.) Such findings suggest that meiotic sex arose early in eukaryotic evolution. Examples of protozoan meiotic sexuality are described in the articles Amoebozoa, Giardia lamblia, Leishmania, Plasmodium falciparum biology, Paramecium, Toxoplasma gondii, Trichomonas vaginalis and Trypanosoma brucei.

Classification 
Historically, Protozoa were classified as "unicellular animals", as distinct from the Protophyta, single-celled photosynthetic organisms (algae), which were considered primitive plants. Both groups were commonly given the rank of phylum, under the kingdom Protista. In older systems of classification, the phylum Protozoa was commonly divided into several sub-groups, reflecting the means of locomotion. Classification schemes differed, but throughout much of the 20th century the major groups of Protozoa included:
 Flagellates, or Mastigophora (motile cells equipped with whiplike organelles of locomotion, e.g., Giardia lamblia)
 Amoebae or Sarcodina (cells that move by extending pseudopodia or lamellipodia, e.g., Entamoeba histolytica)
 Sporozoa, or Apicomplexa or Sporozoans (parasitic, spore-producing cells, whose adult form lacks organs of motility, e.g., Plasmodium knowlesi)
 Apicomplexa (now in Alveolata)
 Microsporidia (now in Fungi)
 Ascetosporea (now in Rhizaria)
 Myxosporidia (now in Cnidaria)
 Ciliates, or Ciliophora (cells equipped with large numbers of cilia used for movement and feeding, e.g. Balantidium coli)
With the emergence of molecular phylogenetics and tools enabling researchers to directly compare the DNA of different organisms, it became evident that, of the main sub-groups of Protozoa, only the ciliates (Ciliophora) formed a natural group, or monophyletic clade, once a few extraneous members (such as Stephanopogon or protociliates and opalinids) were removed. The Mastigophora, Sarcodina, and Sporozoa were polyphyletic groups. The similarities of appearance and ways of life by which these groups were defined had emerged independently in their members by convergent evolution.

In most systems of eukaryote classification, such as one published by the International Society of Protistologists, members of the old phylum Protozoa have been distributed among a variety of supergroups.

Ecology 
Free-living protozoa are found in almost all ecosystems that contain, at least some of the time, free water.  They have a critical role in the mobilization of nutrients in natural ecosystems. Their role is best conceived within the context of the microbial food web in which they include the most important bacterivores. In part, they facilitate the transfer of bacterial and algal production to successive trophic levels, but also they solubilize the nutrients within microbial biomass, allowing stimulation of microbial growth. As consumers, protozoa prey upon unicellular or filamentous algae, bacteria, microfungi, and micro-carrion. In the context of older ecological models of the micro- and meiofauna, protozoa may be a food source for microinvertebrates.

That most species of free-living protozoa have been found in similar habitats in all parts of the globe is an observation that dates back to the 19th Century (e.g. Schewiakoff). In the 1930s, Lourens Baas Becking asserted "Everything is everywhere, but the environment selects".  This has been restated and explained, especially by Tom Fenchel and Bland Findlay and methodically explored and affirmed at least in respect of morphospecies of free-living flagellates. The widespread distribution of microbial is explained by the ready dispersal of physically small organisms. While Baas Becking's hypothesis is not universally accepted, the natural microbial world is undersampled, and this will favour conclusions of endemism.

Disease 

A number of protozoan pathogens are human parasites, causing diseases such as malaria (by Plasmodium), amoebiasis, giardiasis, toxoplasmosis, cryptosporidiosis, trichomoniasis, Chagas disease, leishmaniasis, African trypanosomiasis (sleeping sickness), Acanthamoeba keratitis, and primary amoebic meningoencephalitis (naegleriasis).

Protozoa include the agents of the most significant entrenched infectious diseases, particularly malaria, and, historically, sleeping sickness.

The protozoon Ophryocystis elektroscirrha is a parasite of butterfly larvae, passed from female to caterpillar. Severely infected individuals are weak, unable to expand their wings, or unable to eclose, and have shortened lifespans, but parasite levels vary in populations. Infection creates a culling effect, whereby infected migrating animals are less likely to complete the migration. This results in populations with lower parasite loads at the end of the migration. This is not the case in laboratory or commercial rearing, where after a few generations, all individuals can be infected.

List of protozoan diseases in humans:

References

Bibliography 
 General
 Dogiel, V. A., revised by J.I. Poljanskij and E. M. Chejsin. General Protozoology, 2nd ed., Oxford University Press, 1965.
 Hausmann, K., N. Hulsmann. Protozoology. Thieme Verlag; New York, 1996.
 Kudo, R.R. Protozoology. Springfield, Illinois: C.C. Thomas, 1954; 4th ed.
 Manwell, R.D. Introduction to Protozoology, second revised edition, Dover Publications Inc., New York, 1968.
 Roger Anderson, O. Comparative protozoology: ecology, physiology, life history. Berlin [etc.]: Springer-Verlag, 1988.
 Sleigh, M. The Biology of Protozoa. E. Arnold: London, 1981.
 Identification
 Jahn, T.L.- Bovee, E.C. & Jahn, F.F.  How to Know the Protozoa. Wm. C. Brown Publishers, Div. of McGraw Hill, Dubuque, Iowa, 1979; 2nd ed.
 Lee, J.J., Leedale, G.F. & Bradbury, P. An Illustrated Guide to the Protozoa. Lawrence, Kansas, U.S.A: Society of Protozoologists, 2000; 2nd ed.
 Patterson, D.J. Free-Living Freshwater Protozoa. A Colour Guide. Manson Publishing; London, 1996.
 Patterson, D.J., M.A. Burford. A Guide to the Protozoa of Marine Aquaculture Ponds. CSIRO Publishing, 2001.
 Morphology
 Harrison, F.W., Corliss, J.O. (ed.). 1991. Microscopic Anatomy of Invertebrates, vol. 1, Protozoa. New York: Wiley-Liss, 512 pp.
 Pitelka, D. R. 1963. Electron-Microscopic Structure of Protozoa. Pergamon Press, Oxford.
 Physiology and biochemistry
 Nisbet, B. 1984. Nutrition and feeding strategies in Protozoa. Croom Helm Publ., London, 280 pp.
 Coombs, G.H. & North, M. 1991. Biochemical protozoology. Taylor & Francis, London, Washington.
 Laybourn-Parry J. 1984. A Functional Biology of Free-Living Protozoa. Berkeley, California: University of California Press.
 Levandowski, M., S.H. Hutner (eds). 1979. Biochemistry and physiology of protozoa. Volumes 1, 2, and 3. Academic Press: New York, NY; 2nd ed.
 Sukhareva-Buell, N.N. 2003. Biologically active substances of protozoa. Dordrecht: Kluwer.
 Ecology
 Capriulo, G.M. (ed.). 1990. Ecology of Marine Protozoa. Oxford Univ. Press, New York.
 Darbyshire, J.F. (ed.). 1994. Soil Protozoa. CAB International: Wallingford, U.K. 2009 pp.
 Laybourn-Parry, J. 1992. Protozoan plankton ecology. Chapman & Hall, New York. 213 pp.
 Fenchel, T. 1987. Ecology of protozoan: The biology of free-living phagotrophic protists. Springer-Verlag, Berlin. 197 pp.
 Parasitology
 Kreier, J.P. (ed.). 1991–1995. Parasitic Protozoa, 2nd ed. 10 vols (1-3 coedited by Baker, J.R.). Academic Press, San Diego, California, .
 Methods
 Lee, J. J., & Soldo, A. T. (1992). Protocols in protozoology. Kansas, USA: Society of Protozoologists, Lawrence, .

External links 

 

1670s in science
Obsolete eukaryote taxa
Paraphyletic groups